Mitromorpha aspera is a species of sea snail, a marine gastropod mollusk in the family Mitromorphidae.

Description
The reddish brown shell is spirally lirate and longitudinally closely costulate, the intersections forming a roughly aspirated surface.

Distribution
This marine species occurs in the Pacific Ocean off California, USA.

References

 Carpenter. Jour, de Conch., xii, 146, 1865

External links
 

aspera
Gastropods described in 1864
Taxa named by Philip Pearsall Carpenter